{{Infobox animanga/Print
| type            = manga
| title           = 
| author          = Shūzō Oshimi
| illustrator     = 
| publisher       = Kodansha
| publisher_en    = 
| demographic     = Seinen, shōnen
| imprint         = 
| magazine        = Weekly Young Magazine(2004)Bessatsu Shōnen Magazine(2011)'
| magazine_en     = 
| published       = 
| first           = 2004 (original) May 2011
| last            = August 2011 (re-serialized)
| volumes         = 1
| volume_list     = 
}}

 is a Japanese manga written and illustrated by Shūzō Oshimi. It was first serialized in Kodansha's Weekly Young Magazine in 2004, and later re-serialized in Bessatsu Shōnen Magazine'' from May to August 2011.

It was adapted into a live action film that was premiered theatrically in Japan on June 14, 2014. In March 2022, Kodansha USA announced they licensed the series for English publication, with the one compiled volume releasing on January 17, 2023.

Plot
Toshihiko Ota (Kenta Suga) is a first year junior high school student. He is a member of the school's swimming club. He also suffers from not having enough body hair. Meanwhile, Ayako Goto (Yuiko Kariya) is also a fellow first year junior high student and member of the same swimming club. She suffers from having too much hair. She confides to Toshihiko Ota about her "hairy" problem. A relationship soon develops as Toshihiko begins to shave her arm and leg hair.

Characters
Toshihiko Ōta - Kenta Suga
Ayako Gotō - Yuiko Kariya
Mitsuhiko Ota (Toshihiko's older brother) - Shota Matsuda
Satoko Hokuyu (Mitsuhiko's girlfriend) - Mitsuki Tanimura
Teacher Takakura - Takayuki Kinoshita
Shigeo Goto - Go Riju
Senior Ninomiya - Motoki Ochiai
Mai Sakashita - Moe Arai
Taka Mimura - Taiga
Senior Nakayama - Kai Inowaki

References

External links

2004 manga
Films directed by Daigo Matsui
Kodansha manga
Live-action films based on manga
Manga adapted into films
Seinen manga
Shūzō Oshimi
Vertical (publisher) titles
Japanese romance films